Bahiya Bubsit (born 1967) is a Saudi short story writer.

Born in Hofuf, Bubsit finished her secondary education in 1976, and has since worked in administration at the Educational Counseling Office of her native city. A member of the Women of al-Ahsa' Charitable Association and the Culture and Arts Association of al-Taif, she was awarded the Abha Cultural Prize in 1991. Beginning in 1985 she has written and published a number of volumes of short stories.

References

1967 births
Living people
Saudi Arabian short story writers
Women short story writers
20th-century short story writers
20th-century women writers
People from Eastern Province, Saudi Arabia
20th-century Saudi Arabian writers
20th-century Saudi Arabian women writers
21st-century Saudi Arabian writers
21st-century Saudi Arabian women writers